The Democratic Front (FD), is a heterogenous and mainly regional faction within the Democratic Party (PD), a political party in Italy. The faction was launched by Michele Emiliano, President of Apulia, one of the 20 regions of Italy, and former Mayor of Bari, in the run-up of the 2017 leadership election.

The FD includes centrists, Christian leftists, social democrats, democratic socialists, and left-wing populists.

In the election Emiliano obtained 10.9% of the vote and lost to Matteo Renzi (69.2%) and Andrea Orlando (20.0%). However, Emiliano did well in Southern Italy, obtaining 54.4% in Apulia, 24.4% in Basilicata and 22.6% in Molise.

References

Democratic Party (Italy) factions